Kalatalıq is a village in the Kalbajar District of Azerbaijan. It is suspected that this village has undergone a name change or no longer exists, as no Azerbaijani website mentions it under this name.

References 

Populated places in Kalbajar District
Abolished villages in Kalbajar District